are a Japanese football club based in Kariya, Aichi. They're aiming to gain professional status. Since the 2022 season, after being relegated from the Japan Football League, they are currently playing in the Tōkai Adult Soccer League, which part of Japanese Regional Leagues.

History
The club was founded in 1949 as Nippon Denso Soccer Club. They mainly played in the Tōkai Regional League; Kariya was already represented in the Japan Soccer League by the club belonging to Toyota Industries (not to be confused with nearby Toyota Motors, which is the club that became Nagoya Grampus).

Nippon Denso were finally promoted to the Japan Football League in 1996. They played their first JFL season under new name DENSO Soccer Club because of the change of their owner's name.

DENSO relinquished the ownership at the end of the 2005 season and non-profit organisation Kaeru Sports Club took over.  Their name F.C. Kariya was chosen from entries from the public. Despite this change of ownership, F.C. Kariya did not show much ambition for J. League status in subsequent campaigns and finished in 17th place on the 2009 season of the Japan Football League, being relegated back to the Tokai Regional League after losing a promotion/relegation series to the more ambitious Zweigen Kanazawa.

In 2015, Kariya became champions of the Tōkai Adult Soccer League and participated in the 2015 Regional League promotion play-offs, reaching the Top 4, but not the promotion back to JFL. They also featured three times in the Emperor's Cup, reaching 2nd round both in 2007 and in 2012.

In 2020 season, the Tōkai Adult Soccer League was held in an irregular knock-out format due to the covid-19 pandemic. Lead by a new manager Koji Kadota, FC Kariya won the tournament to qualify for the Regional Champions League, and finished on it as runners-up, resulting in their return to the Japan Football League comeback for the 2021 season, after 11 seasons of unsuccessful promotion attempts.

On the same season, they were relegated back to the Tōkai Adult Soccer League. On 2022, they already won the tournament, pushing themselves to another promotion race with other 11 teams highly ranked either at their Regional Leagues or at the 2022 Shakaijin Cup, at the 2022 Regional Champions League. On the first group stage round, FC Kariya did well, with a 3-match unbeaten streak to secure a place in the Final Round. The top 2 of the 4 teams at the group would qualify to the JFL. In the 2nd of the 3 matches to be played at it, FC Kariya lost their promotion hopes for the season, as they lost their first two matches and couldn't overcome a 4-point gap within just a game left.

Shirt and colours
FC Kariya's shirt features the red sash (or Aka Dasuki in Japanese). This design was originally adopted by Kariya High School's soccer club who introduced the sport to the area in the Taishō period.  Because of this, the red sash is regarded as the symbolic design of Kariya's football.

Stadiums 
They play their home games mainly at Kariya Municipal Athletic Park, but Toyohashi City Iwata General Ballgame Stadium and Nagoya City Port Soccer Stadium are also used a couple of times a year. They practice at Denso Ikeda Factory ground which is not open to the public because it is in Denso's factory site.

League and cup record
Here are listed only the seasons disputed as "FC Kariya".

Key
 Pos. = Position in league; GP = Games played; W = Games won; D = Games drawn; L = Games lost; F = Goals scored; A = Goals conceded; GD = Goals difference; Pts = Points gained

HonoursNippon Denso SC (1949–2005) /FC Kariya (2006–present)Tōkai Adult Soccer LeagueChampions (6): 1993, 1995, 2015, 2016, 2019, 2022Japanese Regional Champions LeagueChampions (2):' 1993, 1995

Current squad

References

External links 
 Official Website 
 Official Facebook page 

Football clubs in Japan
Sports teams in Aichi Prefecture
Kariya, Aichi
Association football clubs established in 1949
1949 establishments in Japan
Japan Football League (1992–1998) clubs
Japan Football League clubs